Dedigama is an electorate once represented by Dudley Senanayake (former Prime Minister) in Kegalle District, Sri Lanka.

References

Electoral divisions in Sri Lanka